Ajayante Randam Moshanam is an upcoming Indian Malayalam-language period action comedy film written by Sujith Nambiar and directed by Jithin Laal, starring Tovino Thomas in triple role alongside, Krithi Shetty, Aishwarya Rajesh, Surabhi Lakshmi and Basil Joseph in the lead roles. The film is produced by Dr. Zacharia Thomas under the banner UGM, in association with Listin Stephen under the banner Magic Frames. The film's cinematography is handled by Jomon T. John and the music is composed by Dhibu Nainan Thomas.

Cast
 Tovino Thomas in a triple role as
Ajayan
Maniyan
Kunjikelu
 Krithi Shetty
 Aishwarya Rajesh
 Surabhi Lakshmi
 Basil Joseph
 Shivajith
 Aju Varghese
 Harish Uthaman
 Rohini
 Pramod Shetty
 Hareesh Peradi
 Sanju Sivram
 Jagadish

References

External links
 

2022 films
2020s Malayalam-language films
Upcoming Malayalam-language films